Patel Vaghajibhai Dharamshibhai (1947-2014) was an Indian politician. He was a member of the Gujarat Legislative Assembly from the Rapar Assembly constituency from 2012 to 2014. He was associated with the Bharatiya Janata Party.

References 

2014 deaths
Bharatiya Janata Party politicians
Members of the Gujarat Legislative Assembly